Paecilaema eutypum is a species of harvestmen from Central America in the family Cosmetidae. It was first described by Ralph Vary Chamberlin in 1925.

References 

Cosmetidae
Taxa named by Ralph Vary Chamberlin
Animals described in 1925